Piotr Petasz (born 27 June 1984) is a Polish former professional footballer who played as a defender.

Honours
Zawisza Bydgoszcz
 I liga: 2012–13
 Polish Cup: 2013–14
 Polish Super Cup: 2014

External links
 

1984 births
Living people
Polish footballers
Footballers from Warsaw
Association football defenders
Ruch Chorzów players
ŁKS Łomża players
Jagiellonia Białystok players
Piast Gliwice players
Pogoń Szczecin players
Wisła Płock players
Zawisza Bydgoszcz players
GKS Katowice players
Polonia Warsaw players
KTS Weszło Warsaw players
Ekstraklasa players
I liga players
II liga players
III liga players
IV liga players